Nanded Lok Sabha constituency is one of the 48 Lok Sabha (parliamentary) constituencies in Maharashtra state in western India.

Assembly segments
Presently, after the implementation of the delimitation of parliamentary constituencies in 2008, Nanded Lok Sabha constituency comprises six Vidhan Sabha (legislative assembly) segments. These segments are:

Members of Parliament

^ by-poll

Election results

General elections 2019

General Elections 2014

General elections 2009

See also
 Nanded district
 List of Constituencies of the Lok Sabha

Notes

External links
Nanded lok sabha  constituency election 2019 results details

Lok Sabha constituencies in Maharashtra
Politics of Nanded district